Umbugarla or Mbukarla is a possible Australian language isolate once spoken by three people in Arnhem Land, northern Australia, in 1981, and is now extinct.

Phonology

Consonants 

 /ɡ/ can be heard as either stops [k] or [ʔ] when in word-final or word-medial position, and as a fricative [ɣ] when in intervocalic position.
 /ɽ/ can also be heard as an alveolar tap [ɾ] when in intervocalic position.

Vowels 

 Vowels can be lengthened when in open syllables or in word-final position.

Classification
Umbugarla was once considered a language isolate (together with Ngurmbur as a dialect), but Mark Harvey has made a case for it being part of a family of Darwin Region languages.

References

External links

 Umbugarla Swadesh List at the Internet Archive

Darwin Region languages
Extinct languages of the Northern Territory
Language isolates of Australia